Brian Spragg (born 7 November 1965) is a New Zealand cricketer. He played in one List A and four first-class matches for Northern Districts from 1987 to 1989.

See also
 List of Northern Districts representative cricketers

References

External links
 

1965 births
Living people
New Zealand cricketers
Northern Districts cricketers
People from Papakura